Smith Park may refer to:

Smith Park (Middletown, Connecticut), a public park
Smith Park (Valdosta, Georgia), a public park
Smith Park, Chicago, Illinois, a neighborhood
Smith Park (Chicago), Chicago, Illinois, a park
Smith Park Architectural District, Jackson, Mississippi, listed on the National Register of Historic Places